Benoît Haller is a French conductor and tenor, born in Strasbourg in 1972.

Biography 
Benoît Haller studied choral and orchestral conducting with Hans Michael Beuerle at the Hochschule für Musik in Fribourg-en-Brisgau. He studied singing with Hélène Roth then Beata Heuer-Christen, Gerd Heinz (opera) and Hans Peter Müller (song repertoire) from 1992 to 2002.

His repertoire includes baroque opera and classic and romantic oratorio.

He is the founder and musical director of the French baroque musical ensemble La Chapelle Rhénane, which he has headed since 2001.

His sister, Salomé Haller, is an operatic soprano.

Selected discography

Benoît Haller, tenor
Deutsche Kantaten - Tunder, Graupner, Bruhns, Kuhnau, Collegium Vocale Gent, Philippe Herreweghe on Harmonia Mundi label in 2000
Missa pro defunctis - François-Joseph Gossec, La Grande Écurie et la Chambre du Roy, Jean-Claude Malgoire on K617, 2002
Kantaten und Kammermusik - :fr:Georg Philipp Telemann, Balthasar Neumann Ensemble, Han Tol on Carus Verlag label in 2004
Salzburg Sacred Music - Wolfgang Amadeus Mozart, Kölner Kammerchor, Collegium Cartusianum, Peter Neumann on Musikproduktion Dabringhaus und Grimm, 2005
Madrigali e Dialoghi - Domenico Mazzocchi, Les Paladins, Jérôme Correas (conductor) on Pan Classics label in 2006
In bel Giardino - Konzertante Madrigale - Giovanni Valentini, Orlando di Lasso Ensemble, Detlev Bratschke on Édition Ch label - Alive in 2007

Benoît Haller conducting La Chapelle Rhénane
Symphoniæ Sacræ • extraits du deuxième Livre (1647) - Heinrich Schütz, on K617 label in 2004
Theatrum Musicum & Leçons de Ténèbres - Samuel Capricornus, on K617 label in 2006
Histoire de la Résurrection & Musikalische Exequien - Heinrich Schütz, on K617 label in 2007
Membra Jesu Nostri - Dietrich Buxtehude, on K617 label in 2008
Passio secundum Johannem - Johann Sebastian Bach, on Zig-Zag Territoires/Outhere label in 2010
Psalmen Davids • extraits du recueil de 1619 - Heinrich Schütz, on K617 label in 2012

References

External links 
Benoît Haller official website
La Chapelle Rhénane

1972 births
Living people
Musicians from Strasbourg
French male conductors (music)
French operatic tenors
21st-century French singers
21st-century French conductors (music)
21st-century French male singers